The DeKalb Avenue station was a station on the demolished BMT Lexington Avenue Line in Brooklyn, New York City. It was opened on May 13, 1885 and had 2 tracks and 2 side platforms. It was located at the intersection of Grand Avenue and DeKalb Avenue, and had connections to the streetcar line with the same name. It closed on October 13, 1950. The next southbound stop was Myrtle Avenue. The next northbound stop was Greene Avenue.

References

External links
DeKalb Avenue Station (New York Transit Museum; Facebook Page)

BMT Lexington Avenue Line stations
Railway stations in the United States opened in 1885
Railway stations closed in 1950
Former elevated and subway stations in Brooklyn
1885 establishments in New York (state)